Anders Peter Ljung (born 30 October 1982) is a Swedish motorcycle speedway rider. He is a former Speedway Grand Prix participant. He was part of the winning Swedish team in the 2003 Speedway World Team Cup.

Career
Born in Åseda, Sweden, Ljung first had success in his native Sweden, winning the second division championship in 1999 with Team Svelux, going on to win it again in 2002 with Vetlanda. In 2002 he finished as runner up in the Swedish Under-21 final.

He made his debut in British speedway in 2003 with Eastbourne Eagles. The same year he was part of the victorious Swedish World Cup team. He returned to the Eagles in 2004 and also went on to ride for Swindon Robins later in the season. He returned to the Robins team midway through the 2005 season for a short spell.

He spent several years away from British speedway, returning in 2010 with Lakeside Hammers, and was named in the team for 2011. After getting a Speedway Grand Prix place in 2012, he decided that he could not commit to a season in Britain.

He raced in the 2012 Grand Prix series, finishing in 15th place. He previously got wild cards in 2003 and 2004.

In 2014 he returned to British speedway riding for Leicester Lions in their debut Elite League season.

References

1982 births
Living people
People from Uppvidinge Municipality
Swedish speedway riders
Speedway World Cup champions
Eastbourne Eagles riders
Swindon Robins riders
Lakeside Hammers riders
Leicester Lions riders
Sportspeople from Kronoberg County